Adichanallur (Tamil: ஆதிச்சநல்லூர்) is an archaeological site in Thoothukudi district in Tamil Nadu, India that has been the site of a number of very important archaeological finds. Korkai, the capital of the Early Pandyan Kingdom, is located about 15 km from Adichanallur. Carbon dating of samples excavated in 2004 from the Adichanallur site has revealed that they belonged to the period between 1000 BC and 600 BC. In 2005, around 169 clay urns containing human skeletons were unearthed that date back to at-least 3,800 years. In 2018, research on copper metal remains remains were dated at Manipur University to 1500 BC (+ or - 700 years). But dating was not accepted as accurate.

Present Excavations
In 2004, a number of skeletons were found buried in earthenware urns. Some of these urns contained writing in Tamili (Tamil-Brahmi) script. While some of the burial urns contained skeletons of Tamil origin, others were found with remains of mostly Australoid, Southeast Asian, East Asian and others. The Australoid were likely contemporary Australian aborigines who were known to have had seafaring qualities

On March 18, 2019, the report of artifact samples sent to Beta Analytic Testing Laboratory, USA for carbon dating was obtained. The results were submitted to the Madurai Bench of the Madras High Court on April 4, 2019. Carbon dating of samples excavated from the Adichanallur site in Thoothukudi district has revealed that they belonged to the period between 905 BC to  696 BC. A Division Bench of Justices N. Kirubakaran and S. S. Sundar observed that this proved Adichanallur was one of the earliest ancient sites in Tamil Nadu. The court had expressed its displeasure that the artifacts, first excavated in 2004-06 under the supervision of the then Superintending Archaeologist T. Satyamurthy, were not sent for carbon dating for over 15 years. “ In spite of many efforts taken by intellectuals, historians, political leaders and archaeologists, nothing was done by the ASI, for reasons best known to them, to send the Adichanallur samples for carbon dating,” the court said. The court had earlier directed the ASI to fence the whole site that is spread across 114 acres and put up a police outpost to prevent any damage. With Sathyabama Badrinath, former Regional Director (South), ASI, currently with the Delhi circle, nominated for preparing the report, the court said that the reports of T. Satyamurthy could also be added in achieving a comprehensive report

Historical Excavations

Adichanallur first gained attention in the year 1876 when a team of three eminent people visited it. The team consisted of the then Collector of Tirunelvely district, district engineer and an Ethnologist from Germany called Dr. Jagor. The team started excavating in one side of a mound and discovered many earthen pots that were of superior quality than the ones being sold at the bazaars of the late 19th Century. Also found were baked earthenware utensils, a number of iron weapons and implements (mainly knives, short sword blades and hatchets) and a huge number of bones and skulls.

Alexander Rea, a former Superintendent from Southern Circle Archaeological Survey of India pointed out that all these artifacts were taken away by Dr. Jagor for the Berlin Museum für Völkerkunde, currently called as Ethnological Museum of Berlin. Alexander Rea himself had done a detailed investigation of the sites during the period between 1899 and 1905, when he was able to find a large number of artifacts similar to Dr. Jagor.

All the artifacts that Rea found was promptly cataloged and documented in his 1915 book titled "Catalog of the Prehistoric Antiquities from Adichanallur and Perambair". It is surprising to note that although the catalog consisted of huge amounts of bronze, iron, gold and earthen artifacts combined, the present day excavations yielded mainly earthen wares only. All of Rea's artifacts are supposedly present in India, however it remains unclear whether they are being preserved properly.

See also

Keezhadi Excavation site
Kodumanal
Arikamedu

References

Further reading
 Catalogue of the prehistoric antiquities from Adichanallur and Perumbair
 Adichanallur - Keezhadi Mann Mooodiya Mahathaana Nahariham published by Dina Thanthi

External links
 Archaeological Survey of India's Page on Adichanallur excavations
 - The Hindu, 17 Feb 2005
 Iron Age habitational site found at Adichanallur - The Hindu, 3 Apr 2005
  Some pottery parallels - Spread of material culture from south to Deccan? - The Hindu, 25 May 2007
Prehistoric antiquities in Tinnevelly
Adichanallur: An Interesting Historical Site of Tamil Nadu
 News from Times of India - ASI had sent two samples to the Florida lab and the lab repo ..

Tamil history
Ancient Tamil Nadu
Tirunelveli
Prehistoric India
Former populated places in India
Archaeological sites in Tamil Nadu
Archaeological cultures in India